Państwowe Zjednoczenie na Kresach (PZK) was a political party in Poland.

History
The party received around 1% of the vote in the 1922 elections, winning one seat in the Sejm. Its single seat was taken by Leon Łubieński.

The party did not contest the next elections in 1928, with Łubieński running as a candidate of the Nonpartisan Bloc for Cooperation with the Government.

References

Defunct political parties in Poland
Political parties established in the 20th century
Political parties disestablished in the 20th century